RX1 may refer to:

 Sony Cyber-shot DSC-RX1 digital compact camera
 RX1, FIA rallycross racing category